Iosif Töjär (29 November 1911 – 1992) was a Romanian wrestler. He competed in the men's Greco-Roman bantamweight at the 1936 Summer Olympics.

References

External links
 

1911 births
1992 deaths
Romanian male sport wrestlers
Olympic wrestlers of Romania
Wrestlers at the 1936 Summer Olympics
Sportspeople from Oradea